Cheryl Miller (born 1964) is an American former basketball player.

Cheryl Miller can also refer to:
Cheryl Miller (actress) (born 1943), American actress and musician
Cheryl Miller (activist) (1946–2003), American activist for medical cannabis
Cheryl D. Miller (born 1952), American graphic artist